Interpretant is a subject (philosophy) / sign (semiotics) that refers to the same object (philosophy) as another sign (semiotics), transitively.

History

The concept of "interpretant" is part of Charles Sanders Peirce's "triadic" theory of the sign. For Peirce, the interpretant is an element that allows taking a representamen for the sign of an object, and is also the "effect" of the process of semeiosis or signification.

Peirce delineates three types of interpretants: the immediate, the dynamical, and the final or normal.

Immediate Interpretant
"The Immediate Interpretant consists in the Quality of the Impression that a sign is fit to produce, not to any actual reaction." (Letter to William James, CP 8.315, 1909)

Dynamical Interpretant
"[The] Dynamical Interpretant consists in direct effect actually produced by a Sign upon an Interpreter of it. [---] [The] Dynamical Interpretant is that which is experienced in each act of Interpretation and is different in each from that of the other... [it] is a single actual event." (Letter to Lady Welby, SS 110–1, 1909)

Final or Normal Interpretant
"[The] Final Interpretant is [...] the effect the Sign would produce in any mind upon which the circumstances should permit it to work out its full effect. [---] ...[It] is the one Interpretative result to which every Interpreter is destined to come if the Sign is sufficiently considered. [---] The Final Interpretant is that toward which the actual tends." (Letter to Lady Welby, SS 110–1, 1909)

See also
 Charles Sanders Peirce
 Charles Sanders Peirce bibliography
 Semiosis
 Semiotics
 Sign
 Sign relation
 Triadic relation

References

Semiotics
Charles Sanders Peirce